Woodchipping in New Zealand is one of the sectors of the forestry industry and it attracted controversy in the 1990s when native trees were used as a source for the chipping.

Wood chip exports
The Ministry of Agriculture and Forestry collates figures on quantities of wood chip exports.

One BDU (bone dry unit) of hardwood chips in roundwood equivalent is 2.25 cubic metres and weighs 1090 kilograms.

Controversy
Since the settlement of New Zealand by Māori and then by Europeans has seen a loss of 75% of the indigenous forest cover. With European settlement in the 19th century, large areas were cleared for pastoral farming and for logging. The export wood chip industry was the main cause of forest clearance on private land after 1970. By the 1980s, 95% of forest loss was due to wood chipping. The native forests were replanted with faster growing species such as the Pinus radiata.

After protests from environmentalists the exporting of wood chips from indigenous forests was stopped by the government in 1996.

See also
Forestry in New Zealand

References

External links
Quarterly Wood Chip Statistics at the Ministry of Agriculture and Forestry
The Forestry Mulching Pros

Environmental issues in New Zealand
Forestry in New Zealand
Environmental issues with forests